Anthonomus musculus, the cranberry weevil, is a pest of blueberries and cranberries Vaccinium macrocarpon Ait. in Massachusetts, New Jersey, Wisconsin, and Michigan. A. musculus is native to North America and ranges from New England to Florida and west of the Rocky Mountains.

Life history 
Females deposit eggs in flower buds, and larvae develop inside, preventing fruit development. Adults are active during the day and feed on flowers, leaves, and buds.
A. musculus is attracted to damaged cranberry flower buds. A. musculus males are attracted to volatile chemicals (hexanol, (Z)-3-hexenyl acetate, hexyl acetate, and (Z)-3-hexenyl butyrate) that blueberry buds emit.

References 

Curculioninae
Small fruit diseases
Beetles of North America